Richard Tottenham may refer to:
 Richard Tottenham (obstetrician)
 Richard Tottenham (civil servant)